Jack Arthur Masquelier (1922-2009), sometimes incorrectly called Jacques Masquelier, was a French scientist. In July 1948 he published his doctoral thesis based on his successful isolation and chemical description of the phytonutrient we know today as oligomeric proanthocyanidins or OPCs. That same year he filed a patent for the industrial method of producing the first botanical product based on OPCs.

External links

French biochemists
1922 births
2009 deaths